Tritheledon is an extinct genus of cynodonts that lived during the Lower Jurassic. Fossils were found in the Elliot Formation, South Africa. Like all cynodonts, it had many traits shared by mammals. Tritheledonts were probably insectivores, and nocturnal animals.

References

Further reading 
 R. Broom. 1912. On a new type of cynodont from the Stormberg. Annals of the South African Museum 7:334-336

Tritheledontidae
Prehistoric cynodont genera
Jurassic synapsids of Africa
Jurassic South Africa
Fossils of South Africa
Fossil taxa described in 1912